Admiral García may refer to:

Edmund Ernest García (1905–1971), U.S. Navy rear admiral
Joxel García (born 1962), U.S. Public Health Service Commissioned Corps admiral
Manuel Rebollo García (born 1945), Spanish Navy admiral